Stresslinux is a lightweight Linux distribution designed to test a computer's hardware by running the components at high load while monitoring their health. It is designed to be booted from CD-ROM or via PXE.

See also

 Inquisitor (hardware testing software) — Linux distribution for hardware stress testing
 Phoronix Test Suite — Linux distribution for benchmarking purposes

References

External links
 Home page

Light-weight Linux distributions
Linux distributions